Robert Moon may refer to:

 Robert Oswald Moon (1865–1953), British physician, writer and Liberal Party politician
 Robert Moon (postal inspector) (1917–2001), considered the father of the ZIP Code
 Robert Charles Moon (1844–1914), ophthalmologist
 Robert James Moon (1911–1989), American physicist, chemist and engineer